Mannironi is a surname. Notable people with the surname include:

Angelo Mannironi (born 1961), Italian weightlifter
Sebastiano Mannironi (1930–2015), Italian weightlifter, father of Angelo and Sergio
Sergio Mannironi (born 1967), Italian weightlifter

Italian-language surnames